

Port Davis is a locality in the Australian state of South Australia on the east coast of Spencer Gulf about  to the west of the city of Port Pirie and about  north of the state capital of Adelaide.

The locality was established in June 1995 in respect to “the long established name.”

Port Davis occupies land on the west and north side of a promontory known as Jarrold Point which itself forms part of the southern side of Germein Bay.  The locality includes the mouth of the Broughton River which is also known as Port Davis Creek.

Land use within the locality consists of conservation along the coastline where built development will be minimal and will be  limited to “low-intensity recreational uses” and where provided, will complement the environment of the locality, and agriculture on its southeastern side.

Port Davis is located within the federal Division of Grey, the state electoral district of Frome and  the local government area of the Port Pirie Regional Council.

References
Notes

Citations

Towns in South Australia
Spencer Gulf
Port Pirie